Hatiora herminiae is a species of flowering plant in the tribe Rhipsalideae, family Cactaceae. It grows as an epiphyte in cloud forests in Southeast Brazil.

Description
Branches occur at the ends of segments. Olive green berries follow the flowers.

Taxonomy
Confusion over the status of the genus name Hariota later led to its replacement by the anagram Hatiora. Like many species in the Rhipsalideae, it has also been placed in the genus Rhipsalis. Molecular phylogenetic studies have firmly placed it in Hatiora.

Distribution and habitat
Hatiora herminiae is endemic to Southeast Brazil, where it is found in the states of Minas Gerais and São Paulo.

Conservation
When assessed in 2010, it was considered to be endangered, the main threat being collection for its attractive flowers, but it was also threatened by declines in habitat.

References

Rhipsalideae
Flora of Southeast Brazil